Robert J. Searcy (1921 – September 17, 2009) was a member of the Tuskegee Airmen, a group of African American military personnel who served with distinction during World War II as the 332nd Fighter Group of the US Army Air Corps.  After the war, Searcy lived in Los Angeles, California.  He died of colorectal cancer in September 2009 at age 88.

Tuskegee Airmen
Searcy was born in Mount Pleasant, Texas, and attended Prairie View A&M University before enlisting in the U.S. Army Air Corps in 1942 following the United States' entry into World War II.  Searcy received basic training at Ft. Hood, Texas, and was assigned to lead a group of airmen to Tuskegee, Alabama.  He later recalled receiving his first taste of segregation when his men were denied access to the Pullman car's dining and sleeping quarters on the train to Tuskegee.  Searcy demanded passage, and the porters, most of whom were African-American, eventually agreed to allow them to pass.  Searcy recalled, "I was put in charge of those men. I felt I had to represent what the Constitution was for those men. That's what leadership is."  Searcy served with the Tuskegee Airmen in Italy, France, the Balkans, the Rhineland, and elsewhere in Europe between 1942 and 1945.  He received commendations for supporting combat missions over Europe, North Africa and the Middle East, and was honorably discharged in 1945.

Post-war years

Searcy later recalled that he tried for years "to forget serving as a Tuskegee Airman" and thought of his service in the segregated U.S. military "as two years, 10 months and 27 days lost."  He had enlisted hoping to become a pilot, but he was assigned to work in a support position as a clerk in military intelligence.  He had hoped to become a doctor before the war, but did not complete college after the war.  After the war, Searcy worked for United Airlines cleaning aircraft in the 1950s.  He also worked at a U.S. Post office in downtown Los Angeles and sold women's clothing.  He also opened several clothing stores in Los Angeles, California.  Searcy married, but had no children.  His wife died in an automobile accident in 1990.  Searcy was a resident of Van Nuys, Los Angeles, California, in his later years.

Attendance at Barack Obama's inauguration
Despite being a Republican, Searcy supported the candidacy of Barack Obama, encouraging others at his Van Nuys retirement home to vote for Obama. Obama invited all of the living Tuskegee Airmen to his inauguration, and a Mississippi ophthalmologist, Dr. Lynn McMahan, flew Searcy and three other Tuskegee Airmen to Washington, D.C., in his private jet.  In agreeing to fly the men, McMahan said, "The Tuskegee Airmen are to pilots like Michael Jordan is to basketball, and Tiger Woods is to golf."  In video footage from the Chicago Tribune, Searcy says of Obama's inauguration, "When I leave this earth, I leave it with a smile on my face."

Death
Searcy died of colorectal cancer in September 2009 at age 88 while visiting his granddaughter in Atlanta, Georgia.

See also
 Dogfights (TV series)
 Executive Order 9981
 Freeman Field Mutiny
 List of Tuskegee Airmen
 Military history of African Americans
 The Tuskegee Airmen (movie)

References

Bibliography
 
 

1921 births
2009 deaths
Deaths from colorectal cancer
Deaths from cancer in Georgia (U.S. state)
Tuskegee Airmen
United States Army Air Forces officers
African-American aviators
21st-century African-American people